Not Ashamed may refer to:
I'm Not Ashamed, a 2016 film directed by Brian Baugh
Not Ashamed, a 1992 album by Newsboys
"Not Ashamed", a song by Jeremy Camp from the album We Cry Out: The Worship Project